The Russian Academy was an institution for research in Russian language and literature in the Russian Empire.

Russian Academy may also refer to:

Russian Academy of Sciences
Russian Academy of Arts
Russian Academy of Music
Russian Academy of Fine Arts
Russian Academy of Theatre Arts
Russian Academy of Medical Sciences
Russian Academy of Natural Sciences